Aipysurus fuscus, commonly known as the dusky sea snake or Timor Reef snake, is a species of sea snake in the family Elapidae. It is found in the Timor Sea between Australia, Indonesia and East Timor and has been classified as endangered.

Description and taxonomy
A. fuscus tends to be dark, colored purplish brown, brown, or blackish brown above. It occasionally has paler bands on the lower flanks. The center of each lateral scale is occasionally darker, giving the appearance of longitudinal striations. It is a member of the subfamily Hydrophiinae, or marine elapid snakes.  The species name of A. fuscus derives from the Latin term fuscus, which translates to "dusky" or "dark," in reference to the snake's coloration. The species is thought to not usually grow beyond  in length, although substantially larger specimens have been found. It is thought to reach reproductive maturity after three or four years, have an average generation time of five years, and an average lifespan of ten.

Behavior and ecology
The snake is venomous. It is also viviparous, or live-bearing. A 2006 study suggested that it was most closely related to Aipysurus laevis, with which it has been documented as hybridizing. It has been recorded as feeding on fish eggs and eels, as well as on wrasses and gobies.

Habitat and distribution
A. fuscus primarily inhabits reefs in shallow marine habitats. The only reliable reports of this species in the wild are from the Timor Sea, from the reefs of Ashmore, Cartier and Hibernia of the Ashmore and Cartier Islands, and the reefs of Scott and Seringapatam. Not more than five subpopulations are thought to exist, and the overall population is severely fragmented. The type specimen was reported as being collected off the coast of Sulawesi, but this location has been called into question.

Conservation status
Catch rates for the species declined drastically between 1998 and 2007, in which year no specimens were found. The estimated decline in the population of A. fuscus is at least 70%. The specific threats to this snake are poorly understood, but they are suspected to have been affected by coral bleaching and general decreases in the health of their ecosystems. These data have led to its being classified as endangered. Ashmore reef, one of five inhabited by A. fuscus, has been a nature reserve since 1983.

References 

fuscus
Reptiles of the Indian Ocean
Timor Sea
Snakes of Australia
Reptiles of Timor
Reptiles of Indonesia
Marine fauna of Oceania
Marine fauna of Southeast Asia
Endangered fauna of Asia
Endangered fauna of Oceania
Reptiles described in 1837
Species endangered by habitat fragmentation
Taxa named by Johann Jakob von Tschudi